is the 36th single by Japanese singer/songwriter Chisato Moritaka. Written by Moritaka and Toshinobu Kubota, the single was released by zetima on July 15, 1998. It is the theme song of the TBS drama of the same name. The song was also used in a 2010 Panasonic camcorder commercial featuring Moritaka.

Music video 
The music video features Moritaka rolling a toy Mini convertible around a house while another version of herself performs the song with her band by the pool.

Chart performance 
"Umi Made 5-fun" peaked at No. 20 on Oricon's singles chart and sold 32,000 copies, becoming Moritaka's last top 20 single.

Other versions 
Moritaka re-recorded the song and uploaded the video on her YouTube channel on August 5, 2012. This version is also included in Moritaka's 2013 self-covers DVD album Love Vol. 1.

Track listing

Personnel 
 Chisato Moritaka – vocals, drums, steel drums
 Yasuaki Maejima – keyboards, piano
 Masahiro Inaba – guitar
 Yukio Seto – guitar
 Yuichi Takahashi  – acoustic guitar
 Takuo Yamamoto – tenor saxophone
 Yohichi Murata – brass, trombone
 Akira Okumura – trumpet
 Gen Ogimi – congas, timbales, shaker

Chart positions

References

External links 
 
 
 

1998 singles
1998 songs
Japanese-language songs
Japanese television drama theme songs
Chisato Moritaka songs
Songs with lyrics by Chisato Moritaka
Songs written by Toshinobu Kubota
Zetima Records singles